This is a list of rivers of Assam, India.

Major
Brahmaputra River
Barak River

Others
Aie River
Balsiri River
Baralia River
Borgang River
Barnadi River
Baroi River
Bhogdoi River 
Beki River
Champabati River
Debang River
Desang River
Dhansiri
 Digaru River
Dihing River (or Buridihing) 
Dikhow River
Doyang
Dudhnoi River
Gabharu River
Gaurang River
Gadadhar River
Jatinga River
Jhanji River
Jiadhal River
Jinari River
Jiri River
Kameng River (also called Jiabhorali)
Katakhal River
Kolong River
Kopili River
Krishnai River
Kulsi River
Kushiyara River
Lohit River
Manas River
Mora Dhansiri River
Nanoi River
Noa Dehing River
Noa-Nadi River
Nona River
Pagladiya River
Puthimari River
Ranganadi River
Sankosh River
Saralbhanga River
Siang River
Subansiri River
Tipkai River
Tuni River
Diju River

See also
List of rivers of India

References

External links
 Principal Rivers of Assam

 
Rivers
Assam, List of Rivers